Surirellales is an order of diatoms.

References

External links
 
 
 Surirellales at algaebase

 
Diatom orders